Heraty is a surname. Notable people with the surname include:

Anne Heraty (born 1961), Irish businesswoman
Toeti Heraty (1933–2021), Indonesian poet